Hokkaido currently sends 17 elected members to the Diet of Japan, 12 to the House of Representatives and 5 to the House of Councillors. The prefecture will send 6 Councillors starting 2019.

House of Representatives 
The current House of Representatives Hokkaido delegation consists of 9 members of the LDP, 8 CDP, 2 Komeito and 1 DPFP.

District seats

PR seats

House of Councillors 
The current House of Councillors Hokkaido delegation consists of 2 members of the CDP, 2 LDP and 1 DPFP. The members are elected from the Hokkaido at-large district.

References 

Politics of Hokkaido
Parliamentary districts of the Diet of Japan by prefecture
Districts of the House of Representatives (Japan)
Districts of the House of Councillors (Japan)